Blunt Force Trauma is the second studio album by American Brazilian metal band Cavalera Conspiracy. The album was released on March 29, 2011 through Roadrunner Records.

Album information
Max Cavalera has this to say about the second Cavalera Conspiracy album on blabbermouth.net:
"Yeah, (we) just got done (in May), so I just got back from the studio. It's finished. We recorded 15 songs, 13 being originals for the album, and then we did a Black Sabbath cover, 'Electric Funeral', that's gonna come out on a Metal Hammer compilation in Europe. And we did a Black Flag cover, a song called 'Six Pack'. We also had a collaboration with Roger from Agnostic Front — he sings on a song called 'Lynch Mob' that we did together in the studio in L.A.; he flew to L.A. to do this collaboration. I was really proud because, to me, Roger is like the godfather of New York hardcore; Agnostic Front is one of the pioneer bands of the whole New York hardcore scene, so it was like recording with a legend of hardcore. The Cavalera album is really intense; that's all I can say about it. It makes the first album sound like pop music."

Regarding the songwriting and recording process for the new Cavalera Conspiracy album, Max said, "I wrote a lot of the stuff and I sent it to Brazil to (Igor) in the form of a CD — like four tracks of the riffs — so that he would be familiarized with the songs by the time I got to the studio. And then I brought another CD with me, which was, like, newer songs I had just got done (writing) for the album. And everything else we did in the studio together — me and him there on the spot. I told him the idea of making a very intense album with some songs being only a minute and a half, so it's a cross (between) Minor Threat and Slayer and Cavalera Conspiracy. So the idea was really cool — Igor really liked that — and from that point on, the album just grew and song after song, every day a new song came in. And I'm really happy with it. I think people are gonna be blown away when they hear it. I think it's a pretty cool album."

Track listing

Personnel
Cavalera Conspiracy
 Max Cavalera – vocals, rhythm guitar
 Igor Cavalera – drums, percussion
 Marc Rizzo – lead guitar
 Johny Chow – bass
Additional personnel
 Guest vocals on "Lynch Mob" by Roger Miret (from Agnostic Front)
 Produced by Max Cavalera
 Co-produced by Logan Mader for Dirty Icon Productions
 Recorded, mixed and mastered by Logan Mader at Undercity Studios, North Hollywood, California
DVD Credits
 Max Cavalera - vocals, rhythm guitar
 Igor Cavalera - drums, percussion
 Marc Rizzo - lead guitar
 Johny Chow - bass
 Richie Cavalera - guest vocals on "Black Ark"
 Igor Cavalera, Jr. - guest drums on "Troops of Doom"
 Joe Duplantier - bass in "Sanctuary" music video

Charts

References 

2011 albums
Roadrunner Records albums
Albums produced by Logan Mader
Cavalera Conspiracy albums